Rensenbrink is a Dutch surname. Notable people with the surname include:

 John Rensenbrink (born 1928), American political scientist, philosopher, journalist, educational innovator, and political activist
 Rob Rensenbrink (1947–2020), Dutch footballer

Dutch-language surnames